Baron Alvanley, of Alvanley in the County Palatine of Chester, was a title in the Peerage of the United Kingdom. It was created on 22 May 1801 for Sir Richard Arden, the Chief Justice of the Common Pleas and former Master of the Rolls.  The title became extinct on the death of his second son, the third Baron (who had succeeded his elder brother), in 1857.

Barons Alvanley (1801)
Richard Pepper Arden, 1st Baron Alvanley (1744–1804)
William Arden, 2nd Baron Alvanley (1789–1849)
Richard Pepper Arden, 3rd Baron Alvanley (1792–1857)

Arms

References

Extinct baronies in the Peerage of the United Kingdom
Noble titles created in 1801
Noble titles created for UK MPs